Daniel Stubbs, II (born January 3, 1965)  is a former American football defensive end in the National Football League (NFL) for the San Francisco 49ers, Dallas Cowboys, Cincinnati Bengals, Philadelphia Eagles, and Miami Dolphins. He played college football at the University of Miami.

Early years
Stubbs attended Red Bank Regional High School in Little Silver, New Jersey. He was a three-year starter in football. He also was a standout in basketball, finishing with a school-record 74 careers blocks, while leading his team to a state basketball title as a junior.

He was recruited by Howard Schnellenberger to play college football at the University of Miami, but Schnellenberger left for the USFL before his freshman season started, making Jimmy Johnson his new head coach.

As a sophomore, he was moved from outside linebacker to defensive end, becoming a starter midway through the season and finishing with 12 sacks (led the team). As a junior, he had 97 tackles and 17 sacks.

As a senior in 1987, he posted 75 tackles and 9.5 sacks, while helping the team win a National Championship. He was named an All American and selected to play in the Japan Bowl in Tokyo.

Stubbs finished his college career as the school's all-time career (39 1/2) and single season (17 in 1986) sack leader. He also had 25 tackles for loss, 267 total tackles and the school record for his position with 139 assisted tackles. 

In 1999, he was inducted into the University of Miami Sports Hall of Fame.

Professional career

San Francisco 49ers
Stubbs was selected by the San Francisco 49ers in the second round (33rd overall) of the 1988 NFL Draft. As a rookie, he was a situational pass rusher behind Kevin Fagan and Larry Roberts. He registered 25 tackles, 6 sacks, one pass defensed and was named to the NFL All-Rookie team.

In 1989, he posted 13 tackles and 4.5 sacks. In the Super Bowl XXIV victory over the Denver Broncos, he had 2 sacks and returned a fumble recovery to the one-yard line to set up a 49ers touchdown.

On April 19, 1990, he was traded along with Terrence Flagler, a third (#81-Craig Veasey) and an eleventh-round (#304-Myron Jones) draft pick to the Dallas Cowboys, in exchange for a second (#47-Dennis Brown) and third-round (#68-Ron Lewis) draft choices.

Dallas Cowboys
In 1990, he reunited with head coach Jimmy Johnson. He was named the starter at left defensive end and finished tied with defensive tackle Jimmie Jones for the team lead with 7 1/2 sacks, while also tallying 59 tackles, 30 quarterback pressures (led the team), 6 passes defensed and 2 forced fumbles. 

The next year, he had a contract holdout and was passed over on the depth chart by Tony Tolbert. He was waived nine games into the season on November 4, 1991.

Cincinnati Bengals
On November 6, 1991, he was claimed off waivers by the Cincinnati Bengals and had a career-high 9 sacks (second on the team). The next year, he led the team with 5 sacks, while playing mostly in passing situations. On August 16, 1994, he was released in a salary-cap move.

Philadelphia Eagles
On April 7, 1995, he was signed as a free agent by the Philadelphia Eagles, reuniting him with Ray Rhodes, a former defensive assistant with the 49ers. He started 6 games and had 5 1/2 sacks (tied for fourth on the team).

Miami Dolphins
On April 4, 1996, he rejected an offer from the Eagles and signed instead a one-year contract with the Miami Dolphins, reuniting with Jimmy Johnson. He started 15 games at right defensive end and finished with 9 sacks (second on the team). 

The next year, he was re-signed, but after not missing any games during his career, he was lost for the season with a right knee injury he suffered in the season opener. In 1998, his play suffered because of injuries, managing 2 tackles and no sacks. He was released in February 1999.

NFL statistics

Personal life
The Stubbs Sandwich is a food item named in his honor, that is sold in a restaurant chain in Coppell, Texas and heavily endorsed by John Madden. On February 3, 2012, because of injuries sustained while playing, Stubbs enter in a law suit in the US District Court for the Eastern District of Pennsylvania against the National Football League (NFL).

References

External links
The 50 Greatest Miami Hurricanes
University of Miami Sports Hall of Fame bio 

1965 births
Living people
Sportspeople from Long Branch, New Jersey
Players of American football from New Jersey
All-American college football players
American football defensive ends
Miami Hurricanes football players
San Francisco 49ers players
Dallas Cowboys players
Cincinnati Bengals players
Philadelphia Eagles players
Miami Dolphins players
Red Bank Regional High School alumni
Sportspeople from Monmouth County, New Jersey
Sports injuries